Apichart Choosakul, also known as Abhijati Jusakul (1956 – September 6, 2010), was a Thai actor and assistant director, known for Dang Bireley's and Young Gangsters in 1997.

Biography & career
Choosakul was born in Saraburi in central Thailand, graduated from Assumption College and received bachelor's degree from Faculty of Communication Arts, Chulalongkorn University.

He became widely known in 1997 as Moo Chien (Sgt Chien) in Dang Bireley's and Young Gangsters, a former mafia police officer who is a senior friend of a group of teenage gangsters led by Dang Bireley. He performed so well that it was memorable to the audience in the style of a discreet old gangster. Someone gave him the nickname "Thai Morgan Freeman".

Since then he has acted in many films and TV series as a supporting actor and has been an assistant director in many Thai and international films such as The Legend of Suriyothai (2001), Stealth (2005), Rambo IV (2008) etc.

In terms of personal life, he is married to Chamaiporn Kalayanamitr by living together for more than 30 years without children.

Death
He passed away on September 6, 2010 from liver cancer. It was detected in February of the same year.

Selected filmography
As actor

film
Dang Bireley's and Young Gangsters as Sgt Chien (1996)
The Beach as Cannabis plantation owner (2000)
Ang Yee: Luuk chaai phan mangkawn as Sa Zhu (2000)
City of Ghosts (2002)
Headless Hero as Suea Men (2002)
Shutter (2004)
Just Friend (2004)
Rescue Dawn as Phisit (2005)
Nong Teng Nakleng-pukaotong as Luang Samai (2006)
Headless Ghost (2007)
Ghost Station (2007)
Elephant White as Advisor Bhun (2011)
Mindfulness and Murder (2011)
TV series
 Silk Knot as Editor Tao (2001)
Niraj sorng pop as Phraya Phonthep (2002)
Nong Mai Rai Borisut as Pol Snr Sgt Maj Lek (2004)
Tarksin Maharaj as Phra Chieng-ngoen (2007)

As assistant director
Aces Go Places 5: The Terracotta Hit (1989)
Heaven & Earth (1993)
Mortal Kombat (1995)
The Legend of Suriyothai (2001)
Return To Paradise (2001)
Stealth (2005)
Rambo IV (2008)

Awards received
Bangkok Critics Assembly Awards 1997 (Best Supporting Actor)

Notes

External links 
 

2010 deaths
1946 births
Apichart Choosakul
Apichart Choosakul
Apichart Choosakul
Apichart Choosakul
Apichart Choosakul
Apichart Choosakul
Apichart Choosakul
Apichart Choosakul